"Taking Over Me" is a 2012 single by Lawson.

Taking Over Me may also refer to:

 "Taking Over Me", a 2003 song by Evanescence from Fallen
 "Taking Over Me", a 2009 song by Rootdown
 "Taking Over Me", a 2014 song by Yemi Alade from King of Queens